Gökmedrese or Gök Medrese (literally: "Celestial Madrasah" or "Blue Madrasah"), also known as Sahibiye Medresesi, is a 13th-century medrese, an Islamic educational institution, in Sivas, Turkey.

History
The medrese was commissioned by Sahip Ata Fahrettin Ali, a vizier  and the de facto ruler of Seljuk Sultanate of Rûm after the death of Pervane in 1277. Up to 1271, he was usually in good terms with Pervane. He commissioned many buildings in Anatolia. Gökmedrese is one of the most imposing of all. The original name of the medrese is Sahibiye, referring to Sahip Ata. But it is usually known as Gökmedrese, because of the sky-blue tiles used at the building.

The medrese was constructed by an architect known as "Kaloyan" (Byzantine Greek: , "Kalo Yianni," literally 'good John') from Konya. Originally, it was a two-story building. There were also a hamam (Turkish bath) and a soup kitchen for 30 people. But presently, only the 13 rooms of the lower floor exist. It was restored in 1823 and was in use up until 1926.

Technical details 
There are two divisions, one leading to the mescit (prayer room) and the other to class rooms.

Vakıf 
In middle age Islamic countries Vakıf was a source of revenue, endowed for the exploitation and the maintenance of the foundations as well as for the salaries of the staff. In Gökmedrese case, there were 85 markets, nine villages, two farms and some other sources endowed as vakfiye.

Gallery

Notes

References

Buildings and structures in Sivas
Seljuk architecture
Buildings and structures completed in 1271
Madrasas in Turkey
Buildings and structures of the Sultanate of Rum
World Heritage Tentative List for Turkey
13th-century madrasas